Kelly Marie (born Jacqueline McKinnon; 16 October 1957) is a Scottish singer, best known for the song "Feels Like I'm in Love", a No. 1 hit in the UK in 1980.

Early career
Born to Alex and Jeanette McKinnon, Kelly Marie began training for a performing career at age ten. She began appearing in singing competitions at age twelve and made her television debut at age fifteen. At age sixteen, as Keli Brown, she appeared on the television talent show Opportunity Knocks winning four times, with her rendition of "I Don't Know How to Love Him". This exposure led to her signing with Pye Records, who released Marie's debut single "Who's that Lady with my Man" in April 1976: that track reached No. 5 in France during the summer and earned a gold disc for sales in excess of 300,000 copies: the follow-up, "Help Me", was also a hit in France, reaching No. 17. Also in 1976, she was credited for her cameo vocal on "Sister Mary" a No. 2 hit in Ireland for Joe Dolan. Her 1977 single, "Run to Me", was a hit in the Netherlands (No. 22) and South Africa (No. 5), while in Canada, the b-side of "Run to Me" titled "Listen to the Children" reached No. 36 on the Canadian A.C. chart, 17 September 1977. 

In 1978, "Make Love to Me" gave Marie her most significant success (to that point) in the English-speaking world, reaching No. 2 in South Africa and No. 5 in Australia: the track spent forty-one weeks in the Australian Top 100 and was ranked as the No. 12 hit of the year.

"Feels Like I'm in Love"
Marie chanced across the song "Feels Like I'm in Love" in a music publishing office: Ray Dorset had written it in 1977 in hopes of having Elvis Presley record it: it's unclear if the song was ever pitched to Presley before his death that year. Dorset's group Mungo Jerry did record the song but their version was relegated to the B-side of a Belgian single "Sur Le Pont D'Avignon" (A-side).

Marie and Peter Yellowstone – who had co-written her hits with Mike Tinsley – saw the potential of the song as a follow-up to "Make Love to Me", and Marie's recording of "Feels Like I'm in Love" returned her to the top 10 in South Africa (No. 7) in November 1979.

Like all of Marie's recordings to that date, "Feels Like I'm in Love" failed to become a hit in the UK, but it did become a popular disco item first in Scotland and eventually all over Britain. The track's prolonged popularity in the clubs led Pye to re-release the song in the summer of 1980, after a No. 61 debut on the chart dated 2 August "Feels Like I'm in Love" entered the top ten on 23 August, and spent the weeks of 13 and 20 September at No. 1. The track also enjoyed international success with chart rankings of No. 6 in Austria, No. 2 in Belgium, No. 6 in Australia, No. 5 in Germany, No. 3 in the Netherlands and No. 1 in Ireland. In addition, the track reached No. 10 on the U.S. dance charts in 1981.

Later career
The intense success of "Feels Like I'm in Love" did not result in any significant stardom for its singer. The decline of Marie's mainstream career became clear when her UK releases subsequent to "Feels Like I'm in Love" charted first outside the top 20 ("Loving Just for Fun" No. 21; "Hot Love" No. 22) and then outside the top 50 ("Love Trial" No. 51). Marie continued to record dance tracks, through which she remained a presence on the international club scene. She took a break from recording in 1984, around the time she met her husband and began a family which would extend to five daughters and one son.

After another absence from recording, Marie cut a new version of "Feels Like I'm in Love" in 1997, and continued recording with dance versions of "Rescue Me", "I'm in the Mood for Dancin'", "Blanket on the Ground", "Runaway", "Millennium", "I Need a Man" and "River Deep - Mountain High" as well as a new version of "Hot Love". Her final recording to date would seem to be a 2002 collaboration with Tina Charles with whom she remade "To Sir With Love" and "Your Disco Needs You".

On 7 May 2005, Marie appeared on the ITV show, Hit Me, Baby, One More Time, singing "Feels Like I'm in Love" and "Oops!... I Did It Again" in hopes of progressing to the final to compete for the major label release of a new single. The popular vote went to Chesney Hawkes.

Discography

Studio albums
 Who's That Lady with My Man? (Pye Records, 1976)
 Make Love to Me (Pye Records, 1978)
 Do You Like It Like That? (Calibre Records, 1979)
 Feels Like I'm in Love (PRT Records, 1981)

Compilation albums
 The Best of Kelly Marie (2002)
 Feels Like I'm in Love – The Ultimate Collection (2007)

Singles

See also
List of disco artists (F-K)
List of Scottish musicians
List of artists who reached number one on the UK Singles Chart
List of performers on Top of the Pops

References

External links
 Official website
 

1957 births
British hi-NRG musicians
Living people
20th-century Scottish women singers
Musicians from Paisley, Renfrewshire
Kelly Marie songs